Christopher J. Dolan, who performs as Quench, is an Australian dance music producer and musician.

Quench's single, "Dreams" was issued in November 1993 as one of four tracks on a split extended play, via Sirius Music. It was written by Dolan, and co-produced by Dolan with Sean Quinn. It was re-released in 1994 and was nominated for the ARIA Award for Best Dance Release at the ARIA Music Awards of 1995. It peaked at No. 9 on the French singles chart, and No. 75 on the United Kingdom Singles Chart. By October 2000 it had sold over a million copies worldwide.

Quench released albums Sequenchial in 1994 and Consequenchial in 2000.

Discography

Albums

Singles

Awards and nominations

ARIA Music Awards
The ARIA Music Awards is an annual awards ceremony that recognises excellence, innovation, and achievement across all genres of Australian music..

|-
| 1995 || "Dreams" || ARIA Award for Best Dance Release || 
|-

References

Australian electronic musicians
Living people
Year of birth missing (living people)